This is a list of video game magazines. The primary focus of the magazines in this list is or was video game journalism for at least part of their run. For general computing magazines that may also cover games, consult the list of computer magazines.

Overview

Journalist reporting and evaluation of video games in periodicals began from the late 1970s to 1980 in general coin-operated industry magazines like Play Meter and RePlay, home entertainment magazines like Video, as well as magazines focused on computing and new information technologies like InfoWorld or Popular Electronics.

However, dedicated magazines focusing primarily on video game journalism wouldn't appear until late in 1981, when several magazines were launched independently of each other at about the same time. Computer and Video Games premiered in the U.K. in November 1981. It was soon followed by Electronic Games in the US, founded by Bill Kunkel, Arnie Katz and Joyce Worley, who had previously written the "Arcade Alley" column in Video. While Electronic Games covered arcade and console games as well as computer software, Computer Gaming World was focused entirely on the latter. The video game crash of 1983 badly hurt the market for North American video game magazines. Computer Gaming World, founded in 1981, stated in 1987 that it was the only survivor of 18 color magazines for computer games in 1984.

Meanwhile, in Japan, the first magazines entirely dedicated to video games began appearing from 1982, beginning with ASCII's LOGiN, followed by several SoftBank publications and Kadokawa Shoten's Comptiq. The first magazine dedicated to console games, or a specific video game console, was Tokuma Shoten's Family Computer Magazine, which began in 1985 and was focused on Nintendo's Family Computer (Nintendo Entertainment System in the West). This magazine later spawned famous imitators such as Famicom Tsuushin (loosely, "Famicom Journal") in 1986 (now known today as Famitsu) and Nintendo Power in 1988.

In the mid-2000s, the popularity of print-based magazines started to wane in favor of web-based magazines. In 2006, Eurogamers business development manager Pat Garratt wrote a criticism of those in print games journalism who had not adapted to the web, drawing on his own prior experience in print to offer an explanation of both the challenges facing companies like Future Publishing and why he believed they had not overcome them.

List

See also 
 :Category:Game magazines
 :Category:Video game magazines
 List of video game websites
 Video game journalism

Notes

References

External links
 Collection of archived video game magazines on the Internet Archive

Game
Magazines